Songs My Brothers Taught Me is a 2015 American independent coming-of-age Native American drama tragedy film written and directed by Chloé Zhao in her feature film directorial debut, and produced by Zhao and Forest Whitaker. Developed at the Sundance Institute workshops, the film, set in the Pine Ridge Indian Reservation in South Dakota, explores the bond between a Lakota Sioux brother and his younger sister.

The film premiered at the 2015 Sundance Film Festival in the U.S. Dramatic Competition section. It was later screened in the Directors' Fortnight section at the 2015 Cannes Film Festival where it received a nomination for the Caméra d'Or Award for best first feature film.

Plot
Sister and brother Jashaun and John Winters live with their mother Lisa (Irene Bedard) on the Pine Ridge Indian Reservation. John helps support his family by illegally distributing alcohol to fellow residents. He is about to graduate from high school and plans to leave the reservation to go to Los Angeles with his girlfriend, Aurelia (Taysha Fuller). Nervous about leaving, he visits his imprisoned brother, Cody, who urges John to leave.

The siblings' father, Carl Winters, dies in an accidental house fire, and they attend his funeral with their mother. Carl's funeral is crowded, as he had 25 children with 9 women. At the funeral the children talk amongst themselves; some chose not to take Carl's name as he was not around for most of their lives.

John goes to the café where Aurelia works, taking Jashaun with him. Getting bored while waiting for them, Jashaun goes to the back of the café where she overhears them talking about moving away together.

Jashaun decides to get a job helping Travis, an artist newly freed from prison, sell his wares. Travis tells her that the reason the number 7 keeps recurring is because of its religious and cultural significance, and also because Crazy Horse said that everything ended at Wounded Knee Massacre but would begin again in the 7th generation, Jashaun's generation.

John breaks the news to Aurelia's family that he is moving to be with her, but they are unimpressed as he will have no place to live and no job. While out on an alcohol run, John is attacked by rival bootleggers and his car is blown up.

Jashaun goes to Travis' home but learns that, while drunk, he and a friend's father beat each other up and were arrested. She goes to her first rodeo where she runs into one of her half brothers, Kevin Winters, who lets her ride their father's favorite horse, Sundance. Kevin tells her that despite growing up in the same home as his parents, they were seldom there, spending all their time at rodeos.

John finally tells his family he is leaving. However, when he arrives at Aurelia's place, he decides not to go and returns home. He gets a job working with one of his half-brothers at a body shop and settles into his life on the reservation.

Cast
John Reddy as Johnny Winters
Jashaun St. John as Jashaun Winters
Travis Lone Hill as Travis
Taysha Fuller as Aurelia Clifford
Irene Bedard as Lisa Winters
Allen Reddy as Bill

Release
Fortissimo Films acquired the film as its international sales agent after its debut at Sundance Film Festival. The film was released in theaters in France by Diaphana Distribution. In January 2016, it was announced that Kino Lorber had come on board as the North American distributor releasing the film in select theatres nationwide beginning in March. It is available for streaming on various online services, including Amazon and Kanopy (US), and made available on MUBI (worldwide) in April 2021.

Reception

Critical response
The film received positive reviews for its honest portrayal of young people's lives on the reservation. The review aggregation website Rotten Tomatoes gives a rating of 94% based on 31 reviews and an average rating of 7.83/10. The website's critical consensus reads, "A naturalistic drama that quietly earns its emotional resonance, Songs My Brothers Taught Me further establishes writer-director Chloé Zhao as a gifted filmmaker and empathetic storyteller."

Accolades

References

External links
 
 

2015 films
2015 drama films
American drama films
2010s English-language films
Films about Native Americans
Films directed by Chloé Zhao
Films set in South Dakota
Native American drama films
2015 directorial debut films
2010s American films